15β-Hydroxycyproterone acetate (15β-OH-CPA) is a steroidal antiandrogen and the major metabolite of cyproterone acetate (CPA). It is formed from CPA in the liver by hydroxylation via the cytochrome P450 enzyme CYP3A4. During therapy with CPA, 15β-OH-CPA circulates at concentrations that are approximately twice those of CPA. 15β-OH-CPA has similar or even greater antiandrogen activity compared to CPA. However, it has only about one-tenth of the activity of CPA as a progestogen. 15β-OH-CPA also shows some glucocorticoid activity, similarly to CPA and unesterified cyproterone.

See also
 List of steroidal antiandrogens

References

Acetate esters
Antiandrogen esters
Cyclopentanols
Chloroarenes
Conjugated dienes
Cyclopropanes
Cyproterone acetate
Enones
Glucocorticoids
Human drug metabolites
Pregnanes
Progestogens
Steroid esters
Steroidal antiandrogens